Glen Hall or Glenn Hall may refer to:

Glen Hall, Indiana, an extinct town
Glen Hall (cricketer) (1938–1987), South African cricketer
Glenn Hall (born 1931), Canadian ice hockey goaltender
Glenn Hall (rugby league) (born 1981), Australian rugby league player
Glenn Hall (Georgia Tech), a residence hall at the Georgia Institute of Technology

Hall, Glen